The EKZ CrossTour is a cyclo-cross racing series held annually in Switzerland since 2014. It is held over 5 races, and the rider with the most total points is declared the winner.

Past winners

Men

Women

References

External links

Cycle races in Switzerland
Cyclo-cross races
Recurring sporting events established in 2014
2014 establishments in Switzerland